The B48 bus route constitutes a public transit line in Brooklyn, New York City, running along Lorimer Street, Franklin Avenue, and Classon Avenue between Flatbush and Greenpoint. Originally the Lorimer Street streetcar line, it is now a bus route operated by MTA New York City Bus.

Route description
The B48 bus route starts at Lincoln Road and Flatbush Avenue in Flatbush, near Prospect Park Station. From there, buses head north on Classon Avenue and south on Franklin Avenue through Flatbush, Crown Heights, and Bedford-Stuyvesant to Flushing Avenue. Once it reaches Flushing Avenue, the B48 turns onto Wallabout Street and Flushing Avenue and then heads north on Lorimer Street. From there, buses run along the length of Lorimer Street until Nassau Avenue. The route then shifts onto Nassau Avenue, and heads east on that street until it ends at Meeker Avenue and Stewart Avenue in Greenpoint, near the Newtown Creek.

History

Trolley service 
The Greenpoint and Lorimer Street Railroad was incorporated on November 6, 1884 to operate along the New Williamsburgh and Flatbush Railroad (Nostrand Avenue Line) from the Broadway Ferry in Williamsburg southeast to Lorimer Street, and then north on Lorimer Street, east on Driggs Avenue, north on Manhattan Avenue, west on Meserole Avenue, north on Franklin Street, and west on Greenpoint Avenue to the Greenpoint Ferry; southbound cars would use Nassau Avenue to Lorimer Street. In addition to the NW&F, this route used the tracks of several other companies: the Brooklyn Crosstown Railroad's Crosstown Line on Driggs Avenue and Manhattan Avenue, the Brooklyn City Rail Road's Greenpoint Line on Franklin Street, and the Bushwick Railroad's Bushwick Avenue Line on Greenpoint Avenue. The franchise was approved on February 26, 1885, and the line was opened by August. The NW&F soon leased the G&LS, and Lorimer Street cars were sent south on the Nostrand Avenue Line to Prospect Park. In July 1889 the Brooklyn City Rail Road leased them both, and rerouted all cars but one per day (to preserve the charter) from Meserole Avenue to Greenpoint Avenue.

Beginning May 30, 1896, the Lorimer Street Line was extended southeast from Prospect Park along the Flatbush Avenue Line and new Bergen Beach Line to Bergen Beach during the summer season. At some point, the line was extended to Park Circle via Ocean Avenue and Parkside Avenue. When the Franklin Avenue Line was discontinued on October 28, 1945, Lorimer Street cars were rerouted to cut west on the Flushing Avenue Line and south on Franklin Avenue to Prospect Park. The north end was rerouted to absorb the Nassau Avenue Line east of Manhattan Avenue, ending near Newtown Creek, when that line was discontinued the same day.

Bus service
Buses replaced streetcars on December 14, 1947, then were replaced with trolley buses from March 23, 1949 to July 27, 1960. The route now runs northbound on Classon Avenue rather than Franklin Avenue; the south end was truncated back to the east side of Prospect Park. From 2010 to 2013, it was further truncated to the Franklin Avenue station in Bedford-Stuyvesant. On January 6, 2019, the B13, B48, B57 and the B60 buses were moved from Grand Avenue Depot in Maspeth, Queens to the Fresh Pond Depot in Ridgewood, Queens.

On December 1, 2022, the MTA released a draft redesign of the Brooklyn bus network. As part of the redesign, B69 service north of Flushing Avenue would take over the B48's route to Greenpoint, while the B48 would take over the B69's route north of Flushing Avenue. Closely spaced stops would also be eliminated. In addition, the B48 would no longer operate overnight.

References

Streetcar lines in Brooklyn
B048
B048